Olympiacos Piraeus B.C. 2008–2009 season was the 2008–09 basketball season for Greek professional basketball club Olympiacos.

The club competed in:
2008–09 Euroleague
2008–09 Greek Basket League
Greek Basketball Cup

Depth chart

Squad changes for the 2008–09 season

In:

Out:

Out on loan:

Results, schedules and standings

Euroleague 2008–09

Regular season
Group A

A1 2008–09

Regular season

Pts=Points, Pld=Matches played, W=Matches won, L=Matches lost, F=Points for, A=Points against, D=Points difference

Greek Cup 2008–09

2009
2008–09 in Greek basketball
2008–09 Euroleague by club